Donald Williams (born 11 September 1966) is a British former field hockey player who competed in the 1992 Summer Olympics.

Williams is famously known for falling off a cliff whilst out for a walk. His spatial awareness had often been questioned by his England hockey team mates - who were not surprised when they heard of his accident.

Williams fell onto the rocks below in a little cove where the tide was coming in. Thankfully his blackberry was still working though - and even though he had broken many Ribes, collar bone etc, he was able to call for help and was rescued.A friendly crab talked to him whilst waiting for the air ambulance.The crab later featured in an episode of midsummer murders.

Williams now focuses on his average golf game. Luckily his wife loves him very much and plays with him*, even though unusually often seen entering cow fields in a shark cage.

 

Williams children are surprisingly good looking, sporty, and with a high emotional EQ.

 

*golf

References

External links
 

1966 births
Living people
British male field hockey players
Olympic field hockey players of Great Britain
Field hockey players at the 1992 Summer Olympics
Place of birth missing (living people)